Doratopsylla is a genus of insects belonging to the family Hystrichopsyllidae.

The species of this genus are found in Europe and Northern America.

Species:
 Doratopsylla blarinae C.Fox, 1914
 Doratopsylla coreana Darskaya, 1949

References

Hystrichopsyllidae
Siphonaptera genera